Lindsay Nicole Chambers is an American actress and singer, known for her work on Broadway and in Submissions Only.

Career
Chambers understudied the female authority figure and Penny Pingleton in the touring production of Hairspray from 2004 to 2005. She moved to Broadway in 2006. She left to be a swing in Broadway's Legally Blonde. She later began understudying Enid in the production instead. In 2009, she played several characters in Perez Hilton Saves the Universe (or at least the greater Los Angeles area): the Musical! off-off-Broadway, and in 2010, she began playing Gail Liner on Submissions Only. She played Robin in Lysistrata Jones off-Broadway and on Broadway in 2012. Once it closed, she played Jovie on the tour of Elf. She played the Velocirapter of Science in Triassic Parq off-Broadway and appeared in the off-Broadway revue Forbidden Broadway: Alive and Kicking, and as Robyn in Sex Tips For Straight Women From A Gay Man before playing Lauren in the national tour of Kinky Boots, beginning in 2014. She left the tour in 2015.

Personal life
Lindsay is married to Chris Barron, the lead singer for the band Spin Doctors.

Theatre credits

Film credits

Television credits

References

Place of birth missing (living people)
Living people
American women singers
American stage actresses
American musical theatre actresses
American web series actresses
21st-century American actresses
1981 births